Agok is a border town in the disputed Abyei region near the South Sudanese border.  Due to the civil war in Sudan between 2007-2011 many of the residents in South Sudan fled to Agok which is the reason why 23,000 of the 30,000 total people in the town are Internally Displaced.  This number used to be much higher with around 90,000 people were displaced in Agok.

History 
Due to the conflict in Southern Sudan, many South Sudanese fled to Abyei, primarily the border town of Agok.  Around 90,000 settled in the area, which decreased to 23,000.  After the war, internal conflicts in Sudan caused tensions between pro-Sudanese and pro-South Sudanese residents which caused a humanitarian crisis in Agok.  On 10 February, 2022, armed militants raided Agok, with 10 civilians killed.  The militants were suspected to be from South Sudan according to Abyei Youth chaiperson, Chol Deng Miyom.

References 

Populated places in South Sudan